The surname Feyer may refer to:

Johan Fredrik Feyer (1821 – 1880), a Norwegian industrial pioneer
A transliteration of the Hungarian surname Fejér:
George Feyer (born  György Fejér), Canadian cartoonist
George Feyer (pianist) (born  György Fejér)